Aechmea emmerichiae is a species of flowering plant in the genus Aechmea. This species is endemic to Chapada Diamantina National Park in eastern Brazil.

References

External links

emmerichiae
Flora of Brazil
Plants described in 1987